The discography of pop and rock band MGMT consists of four studio albums, one compilation album, one demo album, four extended plays, eleven singles (including one as a featured artist) and fourteen music videos. Originally known under the name The Management, the group was founded in 2002 by Andrew VanWyngarden and Ben Goldwasser during their freshman year as art students at Wesleyan University in Middletown, Connecticut. After graduating and changing the band's name to MGMT, they released an EP titled Time to Pretend in 2005 through the independent record label Cantora Records; music videos were recorded for two of the EP's songs, "Boogie Down" and "Destrokk". The critical success of the EP and extensive touring brought the group to the attention of Columbia Records, which signed them in 2006.

MGMT worked extensively with producer Dave Fridmann in recording their debut studio album, Oracular Spectacular, which was released to digital retailers in 2007, with a physical release following in early 2008. The album reached number 38 on the US Billboard 200 and the top ten of the Irish and United Kingdom album charts – it was certified gold by the Recording Industry Association of America (RIAA), double platinum by the Irish Recorded Music Association (IRMA) and platinum by the British Phonographic Industry (BPI). Three singles, "Time to Pretend", "Electric Feel" and "Kids", were released from the album: "Kids" was the only one to appear on the US Billboard Hot 100, peaking at number 91, later receiving a platinum certification from the RIAA.

In early 2010, MGMT collaborated with rapper Kid Cudi and electronic rock duo Ratatat on the single "Pursuit of Happiness", which reached number 59 on the Billboard Hot 100 and was certified platinum by the RIAA: two different music videos were recorded for the song. "Pursuit of Happiness" also achieved chart success in European territories, peaking at number two in France and number three in the Wallonia region of Belgium. The band released their second studio album, Congratulations, in April 2010, with producer Sonic Boom contributing heavily during the recording process. The album peaked at number two in the Billboard 200 and reached the top ten of several other national album charts, including in Australia, Canada, Switzerland and the United Kingdom. Four singles were released from the album: "Flash Delirium", "Siberian Breaks", "It's Working" and "Congratulations", with "Flash Delirium" charting in Belgium, Canada and the United Kingdom. Their self-titled third studio album was released on September 17, 2013.

Albums

Studio albums

Compilation albums

Demo albums

Live albums

Extended plays

Singles

As lead artist

As featured artist

Other charted songs

Guest appearances

Music videos

As lead artist

As featured artist

Notes

References

External links
 Official website
 
 

Discography
Discographies of American artists
Rock music group discographies